Eyu or EYU nay refer to:

 Estonian Yachting Union
 Eyū, an alternate name for Mohsenabad, Mazandaran, a village in Zarem Rud Rural District, Hezarjarib District, Neka County
 Model numbers for the Surface Pen